Posht Tappeh or Poshttappeh may refer to:

Posht Tappeh, Kermanshah
Posht Tappeh, Lorestan